Born Killers (also known as Piggy Banks) is a 2005 American crime drama film directed by Morgan J. Freeman and starring Jake Muxworthy, Lauren German, Tom Sizemore, Kelli Garner, and Gabriel Mann. It was released on DVD on December 11, 2007, by Lionsgate Home Entertainment.

Cast
 Jake Muxworthy as John
 Gabriel Mann as Michael
 Tom Sizemore as Dad
 Lauren German as Gertle
 Kelli Garner as Archer
 Dylan Sprouse as Young John
 Lin Shaye as Willow

Production
Principal photography took place in Utah.

Sexual misconduct allegations
During the making of the film in 2003, Tom Sizemore was told to leave the set after he allegedly touched the genitals of an anonymous child actress. Sizemore denied any wrongdoing, and was allowed back on the film set after the Salt Lake County prosecutor's office decided against going forward with the case "due to witness and evidence problems."

In May 2018, the unnamed actress, then aged 26, filed a lawsuit seeking at least $3 million from Sizemore, claiming his alleged abuse had caused long-standing emotional problems. A statement from Sizemore's publicist again denied the allegations, noting that nothing amiss was reported by a Born Killers staff member tasked with supervising child actors on set. After USA Today reported on August 27, 2020, that a Utah Judge had dismissed the lawsuit, Sizemore released a statement stating: "Beyond the loss of work and the pain and humiliation this has caused me and my family, the thought that an 11-year old girl would think I violated her, whether it be because she misconstrued some inadvertent touching when the director placed her upon my lap for the photo shoot or someone else instilled this idea in her head for whatever malicious, self-serving reasons, is what devastates me most."

References

External links
 
 

2005 films
2005 crime drama films
American crime drama films
Films directed by Morgan J. Freeman
Films shot in Utah
2000s English-language films
2000s American films